The current Malaysian Minister of Higher Education is Mohamed Khaled Nordin since 3 December 2022. The minister administers the portfolio through the Ministry of Higher Education.

List of ministers of higher education
The following individuals have been appointed as Minister of Higher Education, or any of its precedent titles:

Political Party:

References

 
Ministry of Education (Malaysia)
Lists of government ministers of Malaysia